Memory & Cognition is a peer-reviewed academic journal covering cognitive science. It is published by Springer Science+Business Media on behalf of the Psychonomic Society and was established in 1973. The editor-in-chief is Ayanna Thomas (Tufts University).

Abstracting and indexing information 
The journal is abstracted and indexed in:

According to the Journal Citation Reports, the journal has a 2014 impact factor of 2.457.

References

External links

Cognitive science journals
English-language journals
Publications established in 1973
Springer Science+Business Media academic journals